The following articles list English words that share certain features in common.

Lists of words

With unusual spelling
 English words without vowels
 List of English words containing Q not followed by U
 List of English words that may be spelled with a ligature

By formation
 List of English apocopations
 List of English back-formations
 List of portmanteaus
 List of retronyms
 List of words ending in ology
 -graphy
 -ism

By pronunciation
 List of English words without rhymes
 List of the longest English words with one syllable
 List of names in English with counterintuitive pronunciations
 List of onomatopoeias

By provenance
 List of calques
 Lists of English words by country or language of origin

By part of speech
 List of collective nouns
 List of English copulae
 List of English irregular verbs
 List of eponymous adjectives in English
 Post-positive adjective

Regionalisms
 List of American words not widely used in the United Kingdom
 List of British words not widely used in the United States
 List of South African English regionalisms
 List of words having different meanings in American and British English: A–L
 List of words having different meanings in American and British English: M–Z

See also

 List of English-language idioms
 List of 19th-century English language idioms
 List of kennings
 List of Latin and Greek words commonly used in systematic names
 List of Newspeak words
 Longest word in English

Articles about English word lists
 Academic Word List
 Collins Scrabble Words
 Dolch word list
 General Service List
 NASPA Word List (formerly Official Tournament and Club Word List)
 New General Service List

External links
List of English Words Sorted Alphabetically